Crocodile Shoes II is a British six-part television series made by the BBC and screened on BBC One in 1996. The follow-up to Crocodile Shoes, it was written by Jimmy Nail with Nick Mead as script associate.

Where Crocodile Shoes followed Jed Shepperd on his journey from Newcastle to Nashville and all the way back, Crocodile Shoes II showed Jed trying to prove he didn't kill his manager Ade Lynn (James Wilby). During Crocodile Shoes II Shepperd was also sent to prison, became engaged to Wendy and was nearly killed in an accident.

Main cast
Jimmy Nail as Jed Shepperd
Melanie Hill as Emma Shepperd
Sammy Johnson as Archie Pate
Sara Stewart as Lucy
Elizabeth Carling as Wendy
Christopher Fairbank as Alan Clarke
John Bowler as Albert Peplo (Pep)
Kenneth MacDonald as DI McCluskey
Robert Morgan as Warren Bowles

Crew
Jimmy Nail writer, creator, executive producer, title music composer
Nick Mead script associate
Roger Bamford director
Baz Taylor director
Tarquin Gotch executive producer
Peter Richardson producer
Hilary Fagg script supervisor

BBC television dramas
1996 British television series debuts
1996 British television series endings
1990s British drama television series